Kenneth Mitchell may refer to:

Kenneth Mitchell (actor) (born 1974), Canadian actor
Kenneth Mitchell (politician), New York City Council member
Kenneth Mitchell (cricketer) (1924–1986), English cricketer
Ken Mitchell (born 1940), Canadian poet, novelist and playwright
Kenny Mitchell (born 1960), US boxer
Kenny Mitchell (footballer) (1957–2019), English footballer
Ken Mitchell (cyclist) (born 1930), British cyclist